The Battle of Monastir (1917) was a failed French attack against German-Bulgarian fortifications North and West of Monastir, between March 12 and May 26, 1917, during the Salonika Campaign in World War I.

The battle consisted of a series of operations and is known by several names. In French it is known as Bataille de la cote 1248 (Battle of Hill 1248) and Bataille de Pelister (or Péristéri) after the Pelister mountain. In Bulgarian it is named after the Chervena Stena or Crvena Stena ridge, also in the Pelister mountain range. This could be translated as the Battle of the Red Wall, but that name was not used in French or English. Another name for the engagement is the Battle of Lake Prespa.

Background 

In November 1916 the Entente had managed to capture Monastir but it was impossible for them to use the city because it was within the range of the Bulgarian artillery in the Pelister mountain range to the West and Hill 1248 to the north of the city. The Allied commander-in-chief, Maurice Sarrail, made plans for a large spring offensive in 1917, besides attacking the Crna Bend and Doiran, he also planned an attack north and west of Monastir to give the city, which was always under fire, a wider breathing space.

For this attack, Sarrail disposed of five infantry divisions: the French 57th, 11th Colonial, 16th Colonial, 76th and 156th Infantry Divisions.

Battle 
Sarrail's plan was to attack the German and Bulgarian line between the Lakes Ohrid and Prespa and to also launch a frontal attack North from Monastir against Hill 1248. On March 11, the operations between the two lakes began with an intense bombardment and an attack by the 76th French Division against the Crvena Stena west of Monastir, where they captured some strong entrenchments around the villages of Dihovo, Tirnova (Tirnovo) and Snegovo. But resistance from Central Powers forces proved more vigorous than expected, and together with the extremely bad weather, this caused the attack to fail.

The French attack on Hill 1248, which was to have been delivered at the same time, did not commence until the 14th. On the 18th, after four days of intense engagements, the French captured the whole of Hill 1248 as well as the fortified village of Krklino (also named Krklina, Kir-Klina, Kerklino, Kerklina, etc.), taking 1,200 prisoners. But the Central Powers succeeded, by a counter-attack, in recapturing part of Hill 1248, whose summit remained abandoned by both sides. Monastir was somewhat relieved, but the town continued to remain under fire until the Armistice, when more than half of it had been destroyed by the 20,700 shells dropped on the town proper. Some 500 inhabitants were killed and 650 injured.

The Chervena Stena was also retaken by the Bulgarians on 18 May.

Consequences 
This French defeat meant that the whole spring offensive of 1917 left the allies with no results at all.

For the Bulgarians this victory was a great boost in moral and there were even comparisons made with the historic victory in the Battle of Shipka Pass against the Turks in 1877.

See also 
Russian Expeditionary Force in France

References

External links 
 Satellite map of the battlefield around Crvena Stena
 The Story of the Salonica Army by G. Ward Price, Chapter XIII
 Cambrian Daily Leader, Friday 30th of March, 1917 The Monastir gaines
 Historique du 8e RIC (anonyme, Imprimerie Mouton & Combe, TOULON 1920) Chapter X
 Journal de Marche et d'opérations du 34e Régiment d’Infanterie Coloniale (2 août 1914 – 1er avril 1919) Chapter VII
 Pages 1914-1918 Le Pelister ou Péristéri 
 French photos of the battle for Hill 1248, showing French soldiers and Bulgarian prisoners
 Photos and casualties list from the bombardment of Monastir

Battles of World War I involving Germany
Battles of World War I involving Bulgaria
Battles of World War I involving France
Battles of the Balkans Theatre (World War I)
Military history of North Macedonia
1917 in France
1917 in Bulgaria
Vardar Macedonia (1912–1918)
Macedonian front
March 1917 events
April 1917 events
May 1917 events